In infrared astronomy, the N band refers to an atmospheric transmission window centred on 10 micrometres (in the mid-infrared).

References

Infrared imaging